= Polandale, West Virginia =

Polandale
- Unincorporated community
- Location within the state of West Virginia Polandale (the United States)
- Coordinates: 39°10′27″N 81°34′11″W
- Country: United States
- State: West Virginia
- County: Wood
- Elevation: 623 ft (190 m)
- Time zone: UTC-5 (Eastern (EST))
  - Summer (DST): UTC-4 (EDT)
- GNIS ID: 1560480

Polandale is an unincorporated community in Wood County, West Virginia, United States.

The name of the community is derived from the early settlers being natives of Poland.
